Adamov (masculine) or Adamova (feminine) is a Slavic surname. 

There are two theories as to the origins of this last name. According to the most commonly accepted one, they derive from various forms of the Christian masculine given name Adam, which was common in the Ukrainian and Belarusian languages.

Another theory postulates that at least some of these surnames derive from the nicknames which trace their roots to the dialectal word "" (adam), meaning a very tall man.

People with the surname
Arthur Adamov (1908–1970), Russian-born French playwright
Denis Adamov (born 1998), Russian footballer
Grigory Adamov (1886–1945), Soviet journalist and science fiction writer
Jaroslava Adamová (1925–2012), Czech actress
Joe Adamov (1920-2005), journalist and presenter for Radio Moscow (later known as Voice of Russia)
Leonard Adamov (1941–1977), Soviet association football player
Philippe Adamov (1956–2020), French cartoonist
Roman Adamov (born 1982), Russian association football player
Roman Adamov (footballer, born 1991), Russian association football player
Yevgeny Adamov (born 1939), former head of the Russian atomic energy ministry

References

Sources
И. М. Ганжина (I. M. Ganzhina). "Словарь современных русских фамилий" (Dictionary of Modern Russian Last Names). Москва, 2001. 



Russian-language surnames
Surnames from given names